Richard Sears and Joseph Clark won the final against Henry Slocum and Percy Knapp.

Draw

References 
 

Men's Doubles
U.S. National Championships (tennis) by year – Men's doubles